Cryptolechia centroleuca is a moth in the family Depressariidae. It was described by Edward Meyrick in 1922. It is found in India (Sikkim).

The wingspan is about 18 mm. The forewings are whitish-ochreous with some scattered dark fuscous scales. The costa is yellowish-tinged, with some blackish specks and there is a narrow fuscous basal patch, suffusedly extended along the costa to one-fourth. The plical and first discal stigmata are small, black and the plical rather posterior, while the second discal is whitish, surrounded with a cloud of fuscous suffusion and darkest immediately around it. The veins beyond the cell are somewhat marked with fuscous and there is a blotch of fuscous suffusion on the costa towards the apex. There is also a terminal series of blackish dots. The hindwings are rather light grey.

References

Moths described in 1922
Cryptolechia (moth)
Taxa named by Edward Meyrick